The 1994 Nichirei International Championships was a women's tennis tournament played on outdoor hard courts at the Ariake Coliseum in Tokyo, Japan that was part of Tier II of the 1994 WTA Tour. It was the fifth edition of the tournament and was held from 20 September through 25 September 1994. First-seeded Arantxa Sánchez Vicario won the singles title and earned $80,000 first-prize money.

Finals

Singles

 Arantxa Sánchez Vicario defeated  Amy Frazier 6–1, 6–2
 It was Sánchez Vicario' 7th singles title of the year and the 19th of her career.

Doubles

 Julie Halard /  Arantxa Sánchez Vicario defeated  Amy Frazier /  Rika Hiraki 6–1, 0–6, 6–1

References

External links
 ITF tournament edition details
 Tournament draws

Nichirei International Championships
Nichirei International Championships
1994 in Japanese tennis
1994 in Japanese women's sport